The Pegaso Troner made its debut at the 1987 Barcelona Motor show and was to be the last truck model developed by the Spanish manufacturer. Built at Pegaso's Barajas plant, the Troner featured the all-new Cabtec cab developed jointly with DAF Trucks, Pegaso's own 12 litre straight six engine, and 16 speed ZF gearbox. Initially rated at 360 Bhp, power was later raised to 370 and 400 Bhp, the range encompassing 4x2, 6x2, 6x4, 8x2 & 8x4 rigids and 4x2 and 6x4 tractor units. For the UK market a 6x2 midlift tractor unit was offered, the conversion engineered by Southworth of Chorley, Lancs.

The Troner was Enasa's last effort to keep pace with the European truck market but failed to stop the company from losing market share. Eventually control of ENASA was taken over by the Iveco group. Nevertheless, Troners were popular in Spain, and sold well in the Benelux and French markets also. In the UK a large order was placed by the now defunct GB Express. Production of the Troner ceased in July 1993.

References 

Trucks